The Legislative Assembly of Orenburg Oblast is the regional parliament of Orenburg Oblast, a federal subject of Russia. A total of 47 deputies are elected for five-year terms.

Elections

2021

References

Orenburg Oblast
Politics of Orenburg Oblast